John Reford Ewart (26 February 1928 – 8 March 1994) was an Australian actor of radio, stage, television and film. Ewart was a double recipient of the AACTA Award for Best Actor in a Supporting Role

Biography

Career
Ewart, who was born in Melbourne, Victoria to Alfred Adam Ewart an insurance agent and his wife Jennie Grace Madge Lois (nee Macauley) began his acting career when he was cast at the age four in a radio production of Snow White. At the age of 18, he made his film debut in the lead role of Mickey O'Riordan in Charles Chauvel's production of Sons of Matthew.

Ewart appeared in hundreds of Australian radio, theatre, film and television productions. To many thousands of Australians who grew up in the 1950s and '60s, he will be remembered as "Jimm", the boyishly cheeky co-presenter of the ABC Radio Children's Session, and in the title role of its long-running serial The Muddle-Headed Wombat.

He was well known for his role in the film Sunday Too Far Away, his ongoing role in the Australian TV series The Restless Years in 1980–81, and his lead role opposite Nicole Kidman in Bush Christmas. He was proudest of his starring role in the 1977 film The Picture Show Man.

Personal life
Ewart married four times, firstly to Lorraine Marie Croke, a Sydney beauty consultant in May 1951 and had twins, a son and a daughter, but divorced a few years later, he then married Susan Mary Newton, a broadcasting presentation consultant on 17 April 1966, with whom he had 2 daughters. They divorced in 1978 and on 24 December he married public relations consultant Patricia De Heer 

In 1992 he became engaged to TV presenter Jane Fennell, but they postponed the wedding after the death of her father, Ewart's long time friend Willie Fennell. They were married on 8 March 1994 in a bedside ceremony as Ewart was dying of throat cancer. He died five days after the wedding.

Film awards
 In 1976 John Ewart was nominated for the AACTA Award for Best Actor in a Supporting Role for Let the Balloon Go.
 In 1977 he won the AACTA Award for Best Actor in a Supporting Role for The Picture Show Man.

Filmography

Film

Sons of Matthew (1949) .... Mickey O'Riordan
Petersen (1974) .... Peter
Sunday Too Far Away (1975) .... Ugly
The Love Epidemic (1975, Documentary)
Caddie (1976) .... Paddy Reilly
Let the Balloon Go (1976) .... PC Baird
The Picture Show Man (1977) .... Freddie
Blue Fire Lady (1977) .... Mr. Peters
Newsfront (1978) .... Charlie
Run Rebecca, Run (1981) .... Minister for Immigration
Save the Lady (1982) .... Uncle Harry
Deadline (1982, TV Movie) .... Sam O'Bannon
Crosstalk (1982) .... Stollier
Fluteman (1982) .... Clarence Quint
Kitty and the Bagman (1983) .... The train driver
Bush Christmas (1983) .... Bill
A Slice of Life (1983) .... Hughes
Razorback (1984) .... Turner
Frog Dreaming (1986) .... Ricketts
The Big Hurt (1986) .... Harry Gregory
Dear Cardholder (1987) .... Hart
The Returning (1990) .... Steadman Senior
Hurricane Smith (1992) .... David Griffiths

TV Work

Bodgie (1959, TV Movie)
A Night Out (1961, TV Movie) .... Albert
The Hungry Ones (1963, TV Series)
Arthur! And the Square Knights of the Round Table (1966, TV Series short) .... (voice)
Nice and Juicy (1966-1967) .... Mort Hamlin
The Barry Crocker Show (1966) .... Himself (1966-1967)
Bellbird (1967)
Contrabandits (1967) .... Murdoch
The Long Arm (1970) .... Lenny
Division 4 (1970-1975) .... James Barrett / Logan / Paddy Ryan / Alby / Bernie Lewis / Ted Watts / Bob Shaw
Homicide (1971-1974) .... Richardson / Derek Thomas / Bert Doyle / Buster White / Andy Simpson / Ron Fisher / Ray
Matlock Police (1971-1975) .... Billy Ross / Rob Lucas / Arthur Wilson / Harry Green / Geoff Mitchell / Bob Jones / 'Buttercup' Sands
Catwalk (1972) .... Torchy Byrne
The Man Who Shot the Albatross (1972, TV Movie)
Soloman (1973, TV Movie)
Ryan (1974) .... Charlie Bell / Jones
The Hotline (1974, TV Movie)
Ben Hall (1975)
The Last of the Australians (1975)
Alvin Purple (1976) .... Sos Temple / Bus Driver / Mack / Murray
Silent Number (1976) .... Burton
Arena (1976, TV Movie)
King's Men (1976)
Who Do You Think You Are? (1976, TV Series)
Master of the World (1976, TV Movie) (voice)
Number 96 (1976) .... Oswald P. Piper (1976)
The Outsiders (1977) .... Frank Kennedy
The Restless Years (1977, TV Series) .... Chris Hunter
Cop Shop (1978) .... Ted Campbell
Chopper Squad (1978) .... The Bushwalker
The Truckies (1978) .... Spanner
Cass (1978, TV Movie)
Plunge into Darkness (1980, TV Movie)
The Department (1980, TV Movie)
The Young Doctors (1980) .... Horrie Jamison
Bellamy (1981) .... Sid Coleman
A Country Practice (1981-1990) .... Lachlan Morrison / Harry Jolly / Clarrie King / Maurie Wilson / Howard Welbourne
Island Trader (1982, TV Movie)
Kindred Spirits (1984, TV Movie) .... Tommy
Supersleuth (1984, TV Movie)
Special Squad (1984) .... Mungo Lennox
A Fortunate Life (1986, TV Mini-Series) .... Bentley
Dr. Jekyll and Mr. Hyde (1986, TV Movie) .... Gabriel John Utterson
Mother and Son (1986) .... Hospital Worker
The Last Frontier (1986, TV Movie) .... Henry Dingwell
John Norton: A Willesee Documentary (1987, TV Movie) .... John Norton
True Believers (1988, TV Mini-Series) .... Fred Daley
The Heroes (1988, TV Movie) .... Bill Reynolds
Boys From the Bush (1991, TV Series)
Which Way Home (1991, TV Movie) .... Ferguson
Tracks of Glory (1994) .... Syd Melville (final appearance)

References

External links

1928 births
1994 deaths
Australian male film actors
Australian male television actors
Male actors from Melbourne
Deaths from cancer in New South Wales
People educated at Scotch College, Melbourne
20th-century Australian male actors
Best Supporting Actor AACTA Award winners